The 2011 BET Hip Hop Awards was held on October 11, 2011 at Atlanta Civic Center in the ATL. The show were hosted by Mike Epps. The most nominated act of the ceremony was Lil Wayne with 18 nods, followed by Kanye West and Wiz Khalifa with 9. Rick Ross was the third most nominated with 8 nods, while Chris Brown and Nicki Minaj each scored 6.

The show featured the final television appearance by Heavy D, before his death a month later the ceremony venue, and the first television appearance by T.I. after his 11 month prison sentence for drug charges.

Performances 

Rick Ross & Tony Montana/I'ma Boss
Big Sean I DO IT/Marvin and Chardonnay
Future 2 Chainz/Deeper That In The Ocean/Riot
Rick Ross Kelly Rowland Lil Wayne MGK/King Of Diamonds Movation Wild Boy
Big K.R.I.T Country Shit/Money In The Floor
Internet Exclusive Cypher 1 - Chris Sutton, XV, Jay Rock, & Gilbere Forte
 Internet Exclusive Cypher 2 - Rico Staxx, Wais P, Termanology, Sean Cross, French Montana, & Mike Epps
 Cypher 1 - Big K.R.I.T., Tech N9ne, Machine Gun Kelly, Kendrick Lamar, & B.o.B
 Cypher 2 - Reek Da Villain, 2 Chainz, Busta Rhymes, & Ludacris
 Cypher 3 - Lady Of Rage, Blind Fury, Dom Kennedy, & Skillz
 Cypher 4 - Wale, Pill, Stalley, Meek Mill, & Rick Ross of Maybach Music Group
 Cypher 5 - Nitty Scott, MC, Lecrae, Soprano, & Estelle
 Cypher 6 - Ace Hood, Kevin McCall, Tyga, & Chris Brown
 Cypher 7 - Yelawolf, Slaughterhouse (Joe Budden, Crooked I, Joell Ortiz, & Royce da 5'9"), & Eminem of Shady Records

Winners and nominations

Best Hip Hop Video 
 Chris Brown featuring Lil Wayne and Busta Rhymes – "Look at Me Now"
 Big Sean featuring Chris Brown – "My Last"
 DJ Khaled featuring Drake, Rick Ross and Lil Wayne – "I'm on One"
 Eminem featuring Rihanna – "Love the Way You Lie"
 Kanye West featuring Rihanna – "All of the Lights"

Reese’s Perfect Combo Award (Best Collab) 
 Chris Brown featuring Lil Wayne and Busta Rhymes – "Look at Me Now"
 Ace Hood featuring Rick Ross and Lil Wayne – "Hustle Hard (Remix)"
 Big K.R.I.T. featuring Ludacris and Bun B – "Country Sh*t (Remix)"
 DJ Khaled featuring Drake, Rick Ross and Lil Wayne – "I'm on One"
 Lupe Fiasco featuring Trey Songz – "Out of My Head"

Best Live Performer 
 Lil Wayne
 Busta Rhymes 
 Cee-Lo Green
 Jay Z
 Kanye West

Lyricist of the Year 
 Lil Wayne
 Jay Z
 Nicki Minaj
 Rick Ross
 Kanye West

Video Director of the Year  
 Hype Williams
Gil Green
 Anthony Mandler
 Chris Robinson
 Kanye West

Producer of the Year 
 Lex Luger
 J.U.S.T.I.C.E. League
 Kane Beatz
 No I.D.
 Kanye West, Emile, Jeff Bhasker and Mike Dean

MVP of the Year 
 Nicki Minaj
 Lil Wayne
 Rick Ross
 Kanye West
 Wiz Khalifa

Track of the Year 
Only the producer of the track nominated in this category.
 "Black and Yellow" – Produced by Stargate (Wiz Khalifa)
 "6 Foot 7 Foot" – Produced by Bangladesh (Lil Wayne featuring Cory Gunz)
 "I'm on One" – Produced by T-Minus (DJ Khaled featuring Drake, Rick Ross and Lil Wayne)
 "Look at Me Now" – Produced by Diplo and Afrojack (Chris Brown featuring Lil Wayne and Busta Rhymes)
 "My Last" – Produced by No I.D. (Big Sean featuring Chris Brown)

CD of the Year 
Kanye West – My Beautiful Dark Twisted Fantasy
 Big Sean – Finally Famous
Lupe Fiasco – Lasers
Nicki Minaj – Pink Friday
Wiz Khalifa – Rolling Papers

DJ of the Year 
 DJ Khaled
 DJ Drama
 DJ Enuff
 DJ Envy
 DJ Prostyle

Rookie of the Year 
Wiz Khalifa
Big K.R.I.T.
Big Sean
Frank Ocean
Diggy Simmons
Tyler, the Creator

Made-You-Look Award (Best Hip-Hop Style) 
 Nicki Minaj
 Jay Z
 Lil Wayne
 Kanye West
 Wiz Khalifa

Best Club Banger 
Waka Flocka Flame featuring Wale and Roscoe Dash – "No Hands" (Produced by  Drumma Boy)
 Ace Hood – "Hustle Hard" (Produced by Lex Luger)
DJ Khaled featuring Drake, Rick Ross and Lil Wayne – "I'm on One"   (Produced by T-Minus)
Lil Wayne  featuring Cory Gunz – "6 Foot 7 Foot" (Produced by Produced by Bangladesh)
Wiz Khalifa – "Black and Yellow" (Produced by Stargate)
YC Worldwide featuring Future – "Racks" (Produced by Sonny Digital)

Best Mixtape 
J. Cole – Friday Night Lights
Big K.R.I.T. – Return of 4Eva
B.o.B – No Genre
Kendrick Lamar – Section.80
Frank Ocean – Nostalgia, Ultra

Sweet 16: Best Featured Verse 
Busta Rhymes – "Look at Me Now" (Chris Brown featuring Lil Wayne and Busta Rhymes)
Lil Wayne – "Motivation" (Kelly Rowland featuring Lil Wayne)
Nicki Minaj – "Monster" (Kanye West featuring Jay Z, Rick Ross, Bon Iver and Nicki Minaj)
Wiz Khalifa – "Bright Lights, Bigger City" (Cee-Lo Green featuring Wiz Khalifa)
Wiz Khalifa – "Till I'm Gone" (Tinie Tempah featuring Wiz Khalifa)

Hustler of the Year 
 Jay Z
 Diddy
 Lil Wayne
 Rick Ross
 Kanye West

Verizon People’s Champ Award (Viewers’ Choice) 
 Chris Brown featuring Lil Wayne and Busta Rhymes – "Look at Me Now"
 Lil Wayne  featuring Cory Gunz – "6 Foot 7 Foot"
 Nicki Minaj featuring Drake – "Moment 4 Life"
 Kanye West featuring Rihanna – "All of the Lights"
 Wiz Khalifa – "Black and Yellow"

Best Hip Hop Online Site 
WorldStarHipHop.com

I Am Hip Hop 
LL Cool J

References

BET Hip Hop Awards
2011 music awards